The 1967–68 Cypriot Second Division was the 13th season of the Cypriot second-level football league. Evagoras Paphos won their 1st title.

Format
Ten teams participated in the 1967–68 Cypriot Second Division. The league was split to two geographical groups, depending from Districts of Cyprus each participated team came from. All teams of a group played against each other twice, once at their home and once away. The team with the most points at the end of the season crowned group champions. The winners of each group were playing against each other in the final phase of the competition and the winner were the champions of the Second Division. The champion was promoted to 1968–69 Cypriot First Division.

Nicosia-Keryneia-Famagusta Group
League standings

Limassol-Paphos Group
League standings

Champions Playoffs 
Evagoras Paphos  0–0 Enosis Neon Paralimni FC
Enosis Neon Paralimni FC 0–1 Evagoras Paphos

Evagoras Paphos were the champions of the Second Division. Evagoras Paphos promoted to 1968–69 Cypriot First Division.

See also
 Cypriot Second Division
 1967–68 Cypriot First Division
 1967–68 Cypriot Cup

Sources 

Cypriot Second Division seasons
Cyprus
1967–68 in Cypriot football